45 RPM or 45 rpm may refer to:

Vinyl record format 
 Phonograph record
 Single (music), including the 45-rpm format

Albums
 45 RPM (album) or the title song, by Paul Van Dyk, 1994
 45 rpm: The Singles, 1977–1979, by The Jam, 2001
 45 rpm: The Singles, 1980–1982, by The Jam, 2001
 45 RPM: The Singles of The The, 2002

Other uses
 "45 RPM" (song), a 2004 song by The Poppy Fields (The Alarm)
 45 rpm (TV series) or 45 Revoluciones, a 2019 Spanish Netflix series